The Shozma is a river in Nyandomsky District of Arkhangelsk Oblast in Russia. It is a left tributary of the Mosha.

The river flows out of Lake Big Shozhma, crosses the Arkhangelsk-Moscow railway near the village of Shipakhovsky and crosses the village, then flows to the north up to village of Shozhma, which is on the left bank, there it turns to the east. The Shozhma flows in the general direction of the north-east. Another settlement on the river banks was the village of Kondratovskaya (with historical name the "Village of Shozhma" in the middle course of the river. Kondratovskaya is now deserted.

References 

Rivers of Arkhangelsk Oblast